Geobotanically, Missouri belongs to the North American Atlantic Region, and spans all three floristic provinces that make up the region: the state transitions from the deciduous forest of the Appalachian Province to the grasslands of the North American Prairies Province in the west and northwest, and the northward extension of the Mississippi embayment places the bootheel in the [

Wildflowers, grasses, and other nonwoody plants
The wildflowers, grasses, and other nonwoody plants growing in Missouri include the following:

 Adam and Eve Orchid (Aplectrum hyemale)
 Adder's Tongue Ophioglossum spp.
 Engelmann’s adder’s tongue (Ophum engelmannii)
 Southern adder’s tongue (Ophioglossum vulgatum)
 Bulbous adder’s tongue (Ophioglossum crotalophoroides)
 Stalked adder’s tongue (Ophioglossum petiolatum)
 American Feverfew (Parthenium integrifolium)
 American Germander (Teucrium canadense)
 American Ginseng (Panax quinquefolius)
 American Lotus (Nelumbo lutea)
 American Water Willow (Justicia americana)
 Ashy Sunflower (Helianthus mollis)
 Autumn Sneezeweed (Helenium autumnale)
 Bastard Toadflax (Comandra umbellata (formerly C. richardsiana))
 Beaked Hawkweed (Hieracium gronovii)
 Big Bluestem (Andropogon gerardi)

 Bird’s-Foot Trefoil (Lotus corniculatus)

 Bird’s-Foot Violet (Viola pedata)
 Bitterweed or Bitter Sneezeweed (Helenium amarum)
 Black Medick (Medicago lupulina - non-native)
 Black Mustard (Brassica nigra)
 Black-Eyed Susan (Rudbeckia hirta)
 Blackberry Lily (Iris domestica (formerly Belamcanda chinensis))
 Bloodroot (Sanguinaria canadensis)
 Blue Cardinal Flower or Great Blue Lobelia (Lobelia siphilitica)
 Blue False Indigo (Baptisia australis)
 Blue Phlox or Wild Sweet William (Phlox divaricata)
 Blue Vervain (Verbena hastata)

Trees and shrubs 

The trees and shrubs growing in Missouri include the following:

 Shortleaf pine
 Eastern redcedar
 Bald cypress
 Flowering dogwood
 Roughleaf dogwood
 Gray dogwood
 Red hawthorn
 Pawpaw
 Cucumbertree
 Sassafras
 American sycamore
 Black gum
 Sweetgum
 Hackberry
 American elm
 Slippery elm
 Rock elm
 Winged elm
 Osage-orange
 Red mulberry
 Black walnut
 White walnut
 Bitternut hickory
 Black hickory
 Mockernut hickory
 Pignut hickory
 Shagbark hickory
 Shellbark hickory
 Water hickory
 Pecan
 Tulip tree
 American chestnut
 American beech
 Black oak
 Blackjack oak
 Bur oak
 Chestnut oak
 Chinkapin oak
 Dwarf chestnut oak
 Northern red oak
 Overcup oak
 Pin oak
 Post oak
 Scarlet oak
 Water oak
 White oak
 Willow oak
 River birch
 American basswood 
 American hornbeam
 Black willow
 Sandbar willow
 Peachleaf willow
 American willow
 Eastern cottonwood
 Sweet crabapple
 Sourwood
 American persimmon
 American plum
 Black cherry
 Serviceberry
 Eastern redbud
 Black locust
 Honey locust
 Kentucky coffeetree
 American holly
 Possumhaw
 Carolina buckthorn
 Ohio buckeye
 Sugar maple
 Black maple
 Red maple
 Silver maple
 Boxelder
 Staghorn sumac
 White ash
 Prairie rose
 American hazel
 Black haw
 Highbush blueberry
 Smooth sumac
 Fragrant sumac
 Staghorn sumac
 Nannyberry
 Buttonbush
 Honeysuckle
 Ozark witch hazel

See also 
 List of mammals of Missouri
 List of birds of Missouri
 Fauna of the United States
 North American Prairies Province
 Appalachian Province
 Atlantic and Gulf Coastal Plain Province

References

See also
 Tropicos - Flora of Missouri Project
 List of Missouri Plant Species

F01
W01